Thanh Lan (born 1948) is a popular Vietnamese American musician and actress.

Biography
Phạm Thái Thanh Lan was born on 1 March 1948 in Vinh town, Nghệ An province of the State of Vietnam (now Vinh city, Nghệ An province, Vietnam). Her saint's name is Catherine, but she is known by her stage name Thanh Lan. She was born prematurely at seven months as her family was fleeing from war.

Although both of Lan's parents were from Nghệ An (throat-clear voice's area), she had lived in a Northern community in her childhood, so she could only speak the sound of Hanoi (nasal) and Saigon (tongue). Therefore, two sounds greatly influenced her career.

1956–1969: Early life and education

As a student, Lan studied at Lycée Marie Curie. She started learning piano under Saint Paul school sisters's lead, then continued being taught by teachers such as Trần Anh Đào (composer Thẩm Oánh's wife) and musician Nghiêm Phú Phi. She joined a Vietnamese Children band (ban Việt Nhi) to perform in the VTVN and Vũ-đức-Duy drama band (ban kịch Vũ Đức Duy) on THVN, thereafter Seagull band (ban Hải Âu) and finally Life Source band (ca đoàn Nguồn Sống). Thanh Lan had educated the French Literature Major of Saigon University of Literature. In addition, she also audited the classes as tranh, traditional and reformed music at National Academy of Music and Dramatic Arts.

Right from her first year at the Saigon University of Literature, Lan became a well-known young vocalist in South Vietnam to the extent even some Northern artists recognised her. According to her memoir, she often signed her portrait photographs, then stamped them and sent to her adorers.

1970–1975: Career and fame
In the early 1970s, Lan took part in the Young Music Festival as a free singer, to her success. She performed French high-fashioned songs and English songs in Vietnamese. At that time, French songs were only popular with municipal pupils so Lan often lively composed them to Vietnamese lyrics for a wider audience.

In 1970, Lan starred as a main character in the coming-of-age movie Student's Singing by Alpha Films, owned by her maternal uncle Thái Thúc Nha. Her nude scene created an uproar in the Southern press, with several tabloids naming her as the "sexy bomb" or the "princess of gifted arts". For her role she won the award of Promising Actress from the National Award of Literature and Arts. Lan by this point had played a role in about 8 films, therein two telefilms which were aboriginal TV-series in Vietnam or total history of Vietnamese films.  She also collaborated to extensive success with Nhật Trường.

In around 1974, filmmaker Osada Norio flew to Saigon and shot the movie Number Ten Blues with some stars from Japan and Vietnam. Lan was suggested a main female character, because she had been well known in Tokyo since 1971 & further fame was brought to her in the 1973 Yamaha Music Festival. The film project was completed by March 1975 while the South Vietnamese situation was very poor. In April 30, Lan became stranded in Saigon in the midst of panic during the conclusion of the Vietnam War.

Japanese filmmakers thought that she went missing or even that she may have died, whilst at the same time Number Ten Blues was left unreleased because the studio had disbanded. Later, the film title was converted into Goodbye Saigon to memorize a historical moment.

1976–1993: Censorship and emigration

Due to the "campaign to proscribe corrupt cultural products" under the new regime, Lan was censored for 10 years due to the effects of Student's Singing, her films about South Vietnamese soldiers and her discography. Her name was to completely disappear in the air of Vietnamese literature and arts during these difficult times.

Heading into the Renovation period, Lan licensed filming and started performancing some songs which had been accepted by the offices of censorship. She returned as one of the golden voices on the HTV channel.

Though she only starred in few films, for example Cards on the Table (with Nguyễn Chánh Tín) and Behind a Fate (with Trần Quang), most were extremely popular in Vietnam. Her character Thùy Dung of Cards on the Table was particularly admired by Northern young audiences. However, her principal job was a voice actor and vocalist. So during the 1980s, her Northern sound was very popular on Vietnamese televisions and movies. Her talent was even praised by some Soviet filmmakers.

From 1991 to 1993, Lan focused on the development of her music. She co-operated with many studios for recordings and at the same time organized two live shows: Thanh Lan's Singing (1991) and Thanh Lan's Music Night (1992). In 1993, Thanh Lan toured across the United States. After composer Trúc Hồ from Asia Entertainment suggested to her a contract, she decided to settle permanently in the United States.

1994–2013: Life in the United States

Lan had registed at the USCIS office as Catherine Pham (加大肋納•范). Initially, she collaborated with singer Ngọc Lan and some amateur vocalists who spoke French to perform French songs. After the death of Ngọc Lan and especially the decline of pop française, she collaborated again with Trần Thiện Thanh in the songs of soldiers.

Lan confessed to MC Jimmy Nhựt Hà from The Jimmy TV channel that she started writing her memoir in 2003 whilst she had free time.

2014 to present: Later life

About 2012, an old Number Ten Blues tape was found and restored by NHK's experts. After looking for more information from Vietnamese people who lived in Japan, NHK sent staff to California. They showed Lan the restored version's DVD and invited her to attend the 2013 Fukuoka International Film Festival. In this event, she received the Audience Award for Number Ten Blues and Goodbye Saigon.

During the COVID-19 pandemic, Lan could at many times not fly to shows. However, she decided to return to Saigon for an attendance as the guest star in Happy Memories season 2 show of VTV3 channel.

In August 2022, Lan published officially her first memoir The Storms of Life. Typescripts were primarily written in the English language, although she had also translated them to Vietnamese herself.

Personal life
Lan entered a brief marriage at 19, during which she gave birth to a daughter. Her husband - Mr. Dũng - was a Hanoian man from the Long Biên district whose family had settled in Dalat after Operation Passage to Freedom. After the divorce, Thanh Lan and her ex-husband considered each other as the best friends from then until present.

Her maternal uncle Thái Thúc Nha was a famous filmmaker in Asia during the 1960-70s. He was also a president of Vietnam Cinema Society (Tổng-trưởng Hiệp-hội Điện-ảnh Việtnam) who started up the Vietnam Film Day. His son Thái Thúc Hoàng Điệp was also a promising film-director who directed Green Age about Vietnamese hippie's lifestyle.

Thanh Lan was judged as a multi-talented "babygirl" (by movie star Trần Quang) and "miss" (by journalist Lại Văn Sâm). She confessed that is easily resentful. Moreover, she has got an especially favourite to Vietnamese literature.

Career

Publication
Tumultuous Life (Bão tố cuộc đời) in Eng & Vie, Tự-Lực Bookstore & Xpress Print, Garden Grove, California, United States, 2022.

Album
Records
Việt Nam, Sóng Nhạc, Nhạc Ngày Xanh, Sơn Ca, Shotguns, Phạm Mạnh Cương, Diễm Ca, Nghệ thuật - Tâm Anh, Thương Ca, Nhã Ca, Premier, Continental, Trường Sơn,...
Nhạc trẻ 6 - Thanh Lan
Phạm Mạnh Cương 25 - Thanh Lan
The best of Thanh Lan
Tiếng hát xôn xao mộng tình đầu
Tà áo Văn Quân
Paris By Night

Asia

Stage

Những người không chịu chết
Mắc lưới
Chiếc độc bình Khang Hy
Người viễn khách thứ mười
Chuyến tàu mang tên dục vọng (A Streetcar Named Desire)
Đội lốt Việt kiều
Tình nghệ sĩ 
Lá sầu riêng
Lôi vũ
Lồng đèn đỏ
Đoạn tuyệt
Sân khấu về khuya
Phù Dung tự
Công tử Bạc Liêu

Filmography

Student's Singing (Tiếng hát học trò, 1971) — ?
Love (Yêu, 1971) — ?
Tears of Stone (Lệ đá, 1971) — ?
Ngọc Lan (Ngọc Lan, 1972) — Ngọc Lan
The Flower Seller (Gánh hàng hoa, 1972) — ?
On Winter's Peak (Trên đỉnh mùa đông, 1971) — Nguyễn Thị Lệ
My Hamlet (Xóm tôi, 1973) — ?
Don't Let Me Down (Xin đừng bỏ em, 1973) — ?
My School (Trường tôi, 1973) — Songstress Thanh Lan
Eternal Love of My Dream (Mộng Thường, 1974) — Nguyễn Thị Mộng Thường
Number Ten Blues (第十藍調, 1974) — Lan
Cards on the Table (Ván bài lật ngửa, 1984 - 1987) — Thùy Dung
A Song Has Not Only Notes (Bài hát đâu chỉ là nốt nhạc, 1986) — Diệu Hương
Suburb (Ngoại ô, 1987) — Huệ
Two Sisters (Hai chị em, 1988) — ?
Dept of the Crime (Chiều sâu tội ác, 1988) — ?
Behind a Fate (Đằng sau một số phận, 1989) — Thục Nhàn
Heaven for the Dancing Queen (Thiên đường cho cô gái nhảy, 1989) — ?
Black Panther squad (Ba biên giới hay Biệt đội Hắc Báo, 1989) — ?
Love Has No Borders (Tình không biên giới, 1990) — ?
Across the Mist (Bên kia màn sương, 1990) — ?
Human Companionship (Tình người, 1993) — Physician Trang
Ghost Lover (Người yêu ma, 2007) — ?
[...]

Voiceover
Cards on the Table (Ván bài lật ngửa, 1982 - 1983) — Thùy Dung
The Girl on the River (Cô gái trên sông, 1987) — Nguyệt

See also

Trần Quang
Ngọc Lan

Notes and references

Notes

References

Further reading

Bibliography
Lê Quang Thanh Tâm, Điện ảnh miền Nam trôi theo dòng lịch sử, Hochiminh City Culture & Arts Publishing House, Saigon, 2015.
Phạm Công Luận, Hồi ức, sưu khảo, ghi chép về văn hóa Sài Gòn, Phuongnam Books & Thegioi Publishing House, Saigon, 2016-2022.
Lê Hồng Lâm, 101 phim Việt Nam hay nhất, Thegioi Publishing House, Saigon, 2018.
Lê Hồng Lâm, Người tình không chân dung : Khảo cứu điện ảnh miền Nam giai đoạn 1954-1975, Taodan Bookstore, Hanoi, 2020.
Max Hastings, Vietnam : An Epic Tragedy, 1945 - 1975, Harper Perennial, New York City, October 15, 2019.
馬克斯‧黑斯廷斯（原文作者），譚天（譯者），《越南啟示錄1945-1975：美國的夢魘、亞洲的悲劇》（上、下冊不分售），八旗文化，臺北市，2022/04/08。

External links
Thanh Lan : Con gái tôi sợ gặp scandal nên không đi hát

1948 births
Living people
American people of Vietnamese descent
People from Nghệ An province
People from Saigon
Vietnamese Roman Catholics
Vietnamese actresses
Vietnamese screenwriters
Vietnamese dramatists and playwrights
Singers from California
Actresses from California
Screenwriters from California
American dramatists and playwrights